FreeFem++ is a programming language and a software focused on solving partial differential equations using the finite element method. FreeFem++ is written in C++ and developed and maintained by Université Pierre et Marie Curie and Laboratoire Jacques-Louis Lions. It runs on Linux, Solaris, macOS and Microsoft Windows systems. FreeFem++ is free software (LGPL).

FreeFem++ language is inspired by C++. There is an IDE called FreeFem++-cs.

History 
The first version was created in 1987 by Olivier Pironneau and was named MacFem (it only worked on Macintosh); PCFem appeared some time later. Both were written in Pascal.

In 1992 it was re-written in C++ and named FreeFem. Later versions, FreeFem+ (1996) and FreeFem++ (1998), used that programming language too.

Other versions 
 FreeFem++ includes versions for console mode and MPI
 FreeFem3D

Deprecated versions:
 FreeFem+
 FreeFem

See also 
 List of finite element software packages

References

External links 
 

Computational physics
Free science software
Computer-aided engineering software for Linux
Engineering software that uses Qt
Numerical analysis software for Linux
Finite element software for Linux